Tod Strike is an actor, singer and musical theatre performer best known as being one of the original members of The Ten Tenors.

Theatre

References

External links
– The Ten Tenors Official Site
– Official Myspace
– Media Archive (downloadable interviews and performances)

Australian male stage actors
Living people
People from Brisbane
Year of birth missing (living people)